Ein Heldenleben (A Hero's Life), Op. 40, is a tone poem by Richard Strauss. The work was completed in 1898. It was his eighth work in the genre, and exceeded any of its predecessors in its orchestral demands. Generally agreed to be autobiographical in nature despite contradictory statements on the matter by the composer, the work contains more than thirty quotations from Strauss's earlier works, including Also sprach Zarathustra, Till Eulenspiegel, Don Quixote, Don Juan, and Death and Transfiguration.

Background
Strauss began work on the piece while staying in a Bavarian mountain resort in July 1898. He proposed to write a heroic work in the mould of Beethoven's Eroica Symphony: "It is entitled 'A Hero's Life', and while it has no funeral march, it does have lots of horns, horns being quite the thing to express heroism. Thanks to the healthy country air, my sketch has progressed well and I hope to finish by New Year's Day."

Strauss worked on Ein Heldenleben and another tone poem, Don Quixote, during 1898. He regarded the two as complementary, saying they were conceived as "direct pendants" to one another. There was speculation before the premiere about the identity of the hero. Strauss was equivocal: he commented "I'm no hero: I'm not made for battle", and in a programme note he wrote that subject of the piece was "not a single poetical or historical figure, but rather a more general and free ideal of great and manly heroism." On the other hand, in the words of the critic Richard Freed:

Structure and analysis
The work, which lasts about fifty minutes, is through-composed: performed without breaks, except for a dramatic grand pause at the end of the first movement. The movements are titled as follows (later editions of the score may not show these titles, owing to the composer's request that they be removed):

 "Der Held" (The Hero)
 "Des Helden Widersacher" (The Hero's Adversaries)
 "Des Helden Gefährtin" (The Hero's Companion)
 "Des Helden Walstatt" (The Hero at Battle)
 "Des Helden Friedenswerke" (The Hero's Works of Peace)
 "Des Helden Weltflucht und Vollendung" (The Hero's Retirement from this World and Completion)

Ein Heldenleben employs the technique of leitmotif that Richard Wagner used, but almost always as elements of its enlarged sonata-rondo symphonic structure.

Instrumentation

The work is scored for a large orchestra consisting of piccolo, three flutes, three oboes, cor anglais (doubling fourth oboe), E clarinet, two soprano clarinets, bass clarinet, three bassoons, contrabassoon, eight horns in F, E and E, three trumpets in B (briefly used offstage) and two trumpets in E, three trombones, tenor tuba in B, tuba, timpani, bass drum, two snare drums, cymbals, tenor drum, tam-tam, triangle, two harps, and strings, including an extensive solo violin part.

In one section, the second violins are called on to play a G-flat or F-sharp which is a semitone below the normal range of the instrument, and which can only be accomplished by temporarily retuning their lowest string.

Dedication and performances
Strauss dedicated the piece to the 27-year-old Willem Mengelberg and the Concertgebouw Orchestra. However, it was premiered by the Frankfurter Opern- und Museumsorchester on March 3, 1899 in Frankfurt, with the composer conducting. The first American performance was a year later, performed by the Chicago Symphony, conducted by Theodore Thomas. The work did not reach England until December 6th 1902, when the composer conducted Henry Wood's Queen's Hall Orchestra.

Béla Bartók wrote a piano reduction of the piece in 1902, performing it on January 23, 1903, in Vienna. The conductor Joolz Gale was more recently given permission to arrange the work for chamber orchestra, which was commissioned and premiered by ensemble mini on October 16, 2014, in Berlin.

Reception
The German critics responded to Strauss's caricatures of them. One of them called the piece "as revolting a picture of this revolting man as one might ever encounter". Otto Floersheim wrote a damning review in the Musical Courier (April 19, 1899), calling the "alleged symphony ... revolutionary in every sense of the word". He continued, "[t]he climax of everything that is ugly, cacophonous, blatant and erratic, the most perverse music I ever heard in all my life, is reached in the chapter 'The Hero's Battlefield'. The man who wrote this outrageously hideous noise, no longer deserving of the word music, is either a lunatic, or he is rapidly approaching idiocy." The critic in The New York Times after the New York premiere in 1900 was more circumspect. He admitted that posterity might well mock his response to the piece, but that although "there are passages of true, glorious, overwhelming beauty ... one is often thrown into astonishment and confusion". Henry Wood, with whose orchestra Strauss gave the British premiere, thought the piece "wonderfully beautiful".

In modern times, the work still divides critical opinion. According to Bryan Gilliam in the Grove Dictionary of Music and Musicians, this is "mainly because its surface elements have been overemphasized." In Gilliam's view:

Whatever the critics might have thought, the work rapidly became a standard part of the orchestral repertoire. It has been performed 41 times at the BBC Proms since its premiere there in 1903.

Recordings

There are many recordings of Ein Heldenleben, with three conducted by the composer himself. Important recordings include the following:

Notes

References

External links

, Frankfurt Radio Symphony Orchestra, conducted by Andrés Orozco-Estrada. Recorded at the Alte Oper Frankfurt, December 11, 2015
Strauss' Ein Heldenleben: Beyond Autobiography by Timothy Judd, September 11, 2017

Tone poems by Richard Strauss
1898 compositions
Music dedicated to ensembles or performers